B.Kanabur  is a village in the southern state of Karnataka, India. It is located in the Narasimharajapura taluk of Chikkamagaluru district in Karnataka.

Demographics
As of 2001 India census, B.Kanabur had a population of 9930 with 4985 males and 4945 females.

See also
 Chikmagalur
 Districts of Karnataka

References

External links
 http://Chikmagalur.nic.in/

Villages in Chikkamagaluru district